The European Police Achievement Badge (German: Europäisches Polizei Leistungsabzeichen (EPLA)) (French:  Brevet Sportif du Policier Européen) is a decoration offered by the European Police Sports Association (Union Sportive des Polices d'Europe, USPE). It is awarded for proficiency in marksmanship, swimming, and running. The award may be worn as a badge or as a ribbon.

History
In 1982 the member states of the USPE decided to establish the European Police Achievement Badge in order to promote unity among the European police services and as an incentive for sports in police services.

Eligibility
All members of European security services are eligible. For instance members of the police services, military service members, or members of customs.

Requirements
The requirements have to be fulfilled within one year. The requirements vary according to age category and gender.

Marksmanship
 Stance: Standing, one or both hands are permitted.
 Four sets of five rounds over a distance of 25 meters
 30 seconds time limit per set
 9×19mm Parabellum ammunition

Swimming
 Freestyle swimming
 Distance of 300 meters

Run
3000 meters

See also
AE-COPSD Sports badge (French, Brevet Sportif des Polices Européennes (B.S.P.E.); English, "European Police Sports Badge")
German Sports Badge
German Armed Forces Badge for Military Proficiency

Sources
Europäisches Polizei Leistungsabzeichen

References

European awards
Law enforcement awards and honors
Sports trophies and awards
Law enforcement in Europe